FK Liepājas Metalurgs was a Latvian football club in the city of Liepāja and playing in the Virslīga. They played at the Daugava Stadium (capacity 5,083). In 2005 Liepājas Metalurgs became the first team other than Skonto Riga to win the Virslīga since the league restarted in 1991. After the 2013 league season the club was dissolved due to the bankruptcy of its sole sponsor metallurgical plant Liepājas Metalurgs. The club was replaced by FK Liepāja, founded in 2014.

History 
Based in Liepāja, FK Liepājas Metalurgs, got their name from the city's metallurgical factory, founded in 1882, the only one of its kind in the Baltic states.

The history of the club can be traced back to 1945 when two football clubs were founded in Liepāja – Daugava Liepāja and Dinamo Liepāja.

Daugava Liepāja and Dinamo Liepāja: 1945–1947 
In its debut season Daugava Liepāja were runners-up in the Latvian league behind the champions FK Dinamo Rīga. In 1946 Daugava were coached by former Olimpija Liepāja defender Kārlis Tīls and with one of the best former Olimpija players Ernests Ziņģis in attack the team won its first Latvian title. Both Valdis Pultraks and Voldemārs Sudmalis were in the squad. Daugava again won the title again in 1947 and the squad included Miervaldis Drāznieks who went on to score 160 goals in the Latvian league. Daugava Liepāja also won the Latvian Cup in 1946 and 1947.

Dinamo Liepāja did not play in the Latvian top league. However, in 1948 Dinamo won the Latvian Cup with future Liepāja player Žanis Zviedris in the team.

Sarkanais Metalurgs: 1949–1961 
In 1949 Daugava Liepāja and Dinamo Liepāja merged to form Sarkanais Metalurgs which, for the next decade, was the strongest club in the Latvian league. In 1949, Sarkanais Metalurgs won both the league and the Latvian Cup. More titles followed in 1951, 1953, 1954, and from 1956 to 1958. They also won the Latvian Cup three times in a row from 1953 to 1955. In 1954 after beating Daugava Rīga in a match for the chance to play in the Soviet League a united Daugava-Metalurgs club was formed which included six Metalurgs players. In 1954, they competed in the "USSR Class B 1954, 2nd zone" of the Soviet First League the second tier in Soviet football. In the Latvian league the Metalurgs team was made up of mostly the reserve squad. In 1956 Daugava did not include the Metalurgs name in the Soviet League. In 1960 Sarkanais Metalurgs were given a place in the Soviet league and continued playing in the league under various names until 1990. In 1961, the club played as LMR Liepāja.

Zvejnieks Liepāja: 1962–1989 
In 1962, the club changed owners and was renamed Zvejnieks Liepāja. It was considered to be the second team for Daugava Rīga and the club's best players usually had to leave for Daugava. Also if Daugava players needed to have match practice they were sent to Liepāja. In the Soviet league Zvejnieks were usually a mid-table club. With the club playing in the Soviet and not the local league, players from other Republics of the Soviet Union came to play for Zvejnieks. In the 1960s, defender Mārtiņš Lube was the club's captain. Jurijs Romaņenkovs who went on to become the club's coach in 1989–90 played for Zvejnieks in the 1970s.

In the 1980s Vladimirs Žuks coached Zvejnieks and several bright players emerged with the club including Jānis Intenbergs, Ilmārs Verpakovskis, Alekseja Šarando, Vladimirs Babičevs and Ainārs Linards. A number of Daugava Rīga players also played for Zvejnieks including Raimonds Laizāns and Dainis Deglis.

Olimpija Liepāja: 1990–1993 
In 1990, the club was renamed and given the name of a former Latvian club that played in the 1920s–1930s – Olimpija Liepāja.
As Olimpija the club played in the Soviet league in 1990, but in 1991, after Latvia regaining its independence, they played only in the Latvian league and finished in the third place. The Olimpija period saw the emergence of Viktors Dobrecovs at the club. After the breakup of the Soviet Union the first seasons in the newly independent Latvia were difficult for Olimpija as they got financially weaker from year to year.

FK Liepāja: 1994 
In 1994, the club was renamed FK Liepāja but played only one season with that name.

DAG Liepāja: 1995–1996 
In 1995 FK Liepāja was merged with FC Dag Rīga to form DAG Liepāja. The club reached the 1995 Latvian Cup final where they lost 3–0 to Skonto FC. Ainārs Linards returned to the club in 1995. In the Latvian league the club finished 8th out of ten clubs in 1996.

Baltika Liepāja: 1996–1997 
In 1996, the club changed owners again and became Baltika Liepāja. In 1996 Māris Verpakovskis, the son of Ilmārs Verpakovskis and future Latvia national football team international made his debut for the club. For some time the club was on the brink of bankruptcy and struggled to stop the best players from leaving the club. However, the club got new funding from the local Metallurgy factory and for the 1997 season at last had a stable budget and ambitious plans again.

FK Liepājas Metalurgs: 1997–2013 
In 1998 Metalurgs with Jurijs Popkovs as their head coach finished second behind Skonto in the Latvian Virslīga and each season up to 2004 Metalurgs finished second in the championship. In the Latvian Cup they also lost three cup finals. In 2005 Metalurgs finally became Virslīga champions and won the first title for Liepāja in an independent Latvia since the 1930s. In 2006 Metalurgs also finally won the Latvian Cup. The next league title came in 2009.

2013 
After the 2013 league season the club was dissolved due to the bankruptcy of its sole sponsor metallurgical plant Liepājas Metalurgs. There were talks held with potential investors about salvation of the club, but due to lack of suitable options a decision was made to end its existence. The club was replaced by FK Liepāja, founded in 2014.

Honours 
Virslīga winners
 2005, 2009
Virslīga runners-up
 1998, 1999, 2003, 2004, 2006, 2007, 2008, 2011
Latvian Cup winners
 1946, 1947, 1948, 1953, 1954, 1955, 1963, 1964, 2006
Baltic League winners
 2007
 Latvian Soviet league winners
 1946, 1947, 1949, 1951, 1953, 1954, 1956, 1957, 1958

League and Cup history

Latvian SSR / Soviet Union 
Sarkanais Metalurgs

Soviet Union 
Zvejnieks Liepaja

Olimpija Liepāja

Baltic 
Liepājas Metalurgs

Latvian SSR / Soviet Union 

Olimpija Liepāja

Latvia 
Olimpija Liepāja

FK Liepāja

DAG Liepāja

FK Liepāja / FK Baltika

FK Liepājas Metalurgs

{|class="wikitable"
|-bgcolor="#efefef"
! Season
!    Division (Name)
! Pos./Teams
! Pl.
! W
! D
! L
! GS
! GA
! P
!Latvian Football Cup
|-
|align=center|1997
|align=center|1st (Virslīga)
|align=center |5/(9)
|align=center|24
|align=center|9
|align=center|4
|align=center|11
|align=center|27
|align=center|32
|align=center|31
|align=center bgcolor=|did not participate
|-
|align=center|1998
|align=center|1st (Virslīga)
|align=center bgcolor=silver|2/(8)
|align=center|28
|align=center|17
|align=center|6
|align=center|5
|align=center|62
|align=center|25
|align=center|57
|align=center bgcolor=silver|Runner-up
|-
|align=center|1999
|align=center|1st (Virslīga)
|align=center bgcolor=silver|2/(8)
|align=center|28
|align=center|19
|align=center|3
|align=center|6
|align=center|75
|align=center|25
|align=center|60
|align=center bgcolor=#A67D3D|semi-finals
|-
|align=center|2000
|align=center|1st (Virslīga)
|align=center bgcolor=#A67D3D|3/(8)
|align=center|28
|align=center|16
|align=center|7
|align=center|5
|align=center|51
|align=center|25
|align=center|55
|align=center bgcolor=silver|Runner-up
|-
|align=center|2001
|align=center|1st (Virslīga)
|align=center bgcolor=#A67D3D|3/(8)
|align=center|28
|align=center|20
|align=center|4
|align=center|4
|align=center|60
|align=center|24
|align=center|64
|align=center bgcolor=#A67D3D|semi-finals
|-
|align=center|2002
|align=center|1st (Virslīga)
|align=center bgcolor=#A67D3D|3/(8)
|align=center|28
|align=center|15
|align=center|6
|align=center|7
|align=center|56
|align=center|31
|align=center|51
|align=center bgcolor=silver|Runner-up
|-
|align=center|2003
|align=center|1st (Virslīga)
|align=center bgcolor=silver|2/(8)
|align=center|28
|align=center|22
|align=center|2
|align=center|4
|align=center|100
|align=center|29
|align=center|68
|align=center |1/4 finals
|-
|align=center|2004
|align=center|1st (Virslīga)
|align=center bgcolor=silver|2/(8)
|align=center|28
|align=center|21
|align=center|3
|align=center|4
|align=center|85
|align=center|27
|align=center|66
|align=center bgcolor=#A67D3D|semi-finals
|-
|align=center|2005
|align=center|1st (Virslīga)
|align=center bgcolor=gold|1/(8)
|align=center|28
|align=center|22
|align=center|5
|align=center|1
|align=center|85
|align=center|19
|align=center|71
|align=center bgcolor=silver|Runner-up
|-
|align=center|2006
|align=center|1st (Virslīga)
|align=center bgcolor=silver|2/(8)
|align=center|28
|align=center|18
|align=center|6
|align=center|4
|align=center|66
|align=center|20
|align=center|62
|align=center bgcolor=gold|Winner
|-
|align=center|2007
|align=center|1st (Virslīga)
|align=center bgcolor=silver|2/(8)
|align=center|28
|align=center|18
|align=center|4
|align=center|6
|align=center|42
|align=center|21
|align=center|58
|align=center |1/4 finals
|-
|align=center|2008
|align=center|1st (Virslīga)
|align=center bgcolor=silver|2/(10)
|align=center|28
|align=center|14
|align=center|11
|align=center|3
|align=center|48
|align=center|25
|align=center|53
|align=center |1/4 finals
|-
|align=center|2009
|align=center|1st (Virslīga)
|align=center bgcolor=gold|1/(9)
|align=center|32
|align=center|25
|align=center|4
|align=center|3
|align=center|96
|align=center|23
|align=center|79
|align=center |1/4 finals
|-
|align=center|2010
|align=center|1st (Virslīga)
|align=center bgcolor=#A67D3D|3/(10)
|align=center|27
|align=center|19
|align=center|4
|align=center|4
|align=center|70
|align=center|20
|align=center|61
|align=center |1/4 finals
|-
|align=center|2011
|align=center|1st (Virslīga)
|align=center bgcolor=silver|2/(9)
|align=center|32
|align=center|22
|align=center|4
|align=center|6
|align=center|74
|align=center|26
|align=center|70
|align=center bgcolor=silver|Runner-up
|-
|align=center|2012
|align=center|1st (Virslīga)
|align=center|4/(10)
|align=center|36
|align=center|21
|align=center|7
|align=center|8
|align=center|60
|align=center|33
|align=center|70
|align=center bgcolor=silver|Runner-up
|-
|align=center|2013
|align=center|1st (Virslīga)
|align=center|5/(10)
|align=center|27
|align=center|11
|align=center|7
|align=center|9
|align=center|54
|align=center|35
|align=center|40
|align=center bgcolor=#A67D3D|semi-finals
|}

Participation in the Baltic League

Europe record

UEFA Team Ranking 2012/13

Sponsors

Notable former players 
FK Liepājas Metalurgs players who have either appeared for their respective national team at any time or received an individual award while at the club.

 Māris Verpakovskis
 Andrejs Rubins
 Jānis Ikaunieks (footballer)
 Dāvis Ikaunieks
 Deniss Rakels
 Oskars Kļava
 Deniss Ivanovs
 Viktors Dobrecovs
 Ģirts Karlsons
 Genādijs Soloņicins
 Vladimirs Kamešs
 Vladimirs Babičevs
 Ritus Krjauklis
 Valentīns Lobaņovs
 Ilmārs Verpakovskis
 Artūrs Zakreševskis
 Dzintars Zirnis
 Armands Zeiberliņš
 Pāvels Mihadjuks
 Andrejs Prohorenkovs
 Jurģis Pučinskis
 Maksims Rafaļskis
 Kristaps Grebis
 Dzintars Sproģis
 Pāvels Šteinbors
 Antonio Ferreira de Oliveira Junior
 Takafumi Akahoshi
 Valeri Shantalosau
 Radzislaw Arlowski
 Nerijus Valskis
 Mindaugas Kalonas
 Artūras Rimkevičius
 Darius Gvildys
 Giedrius Žutautas
 Tomas Tamošauskas
 Vladimir Tatarchuk
 Aleksei Bobrov
 Sergei Skoblyakov
 Aleksandr Katasonov
 Mikhail Nikolayevich Solovyov
 David Yurchenko
 Serhiy Seleznyov
 Yuriy Hrytsyna
 Andrei Cojocari

Managers

Women's team 
The women's team played in the Latvian highest league and won the championship in 2010 and 2012. It represented Latvia at the 2011–12 UEFA Women's Champions League. It was the first time a team from Latvia had entered the competition since its creation in 2001–02.

See also 
FK Liepāja

References

External links 
Latvian Football Federation website 
Soccerway.com 

 
Sport in Liepāja
Defunct football clubs in Latvia
Women's football clubs in Latvia
Association football clubs established in 1997
1997 establishments in Latvia
2013 disestablishments in Latvia
Association football clubs disestablished in 2013
Works association football teams